So Runs the Way is a 1913 American short drama film, directed by Christy Cabanne.

Cast
 Reggie Morris as Frederick A.Paulson
 Lillian Gish as The Young Woman
 Lionel Barrymore as Undetermined Role (unconfirmed)
 Joseph McDermott as The Detective
 Owen Moore as Undetermined Role (unconfirmed)
 Frances Nelson as Undetermined Role
 W.C. Robinson as The Butler
 Kate Toncray as At Party

External links

1913 films
1913 drama films
1913 short films
Silent American drama films
American silent short films
American black-and-white films
Films directed by Christy Cabanne
1910s American films